This is a list of ambassadors to Moldova. Note that some ambassadors are responsible for more than one country while others are directly accredited to Chișinău.

Current Ambassadors to Moldova

See also
 Foreign relations of Moldova
 List of diplomatic missions of Moldova
 List of diplomatic missions in Moldova

References 

Ministry of Foreign Affairs and European Integration - Diplomatic List

Moldova

Moldova diplomacy-related lists